Deroli Jat is a village in Mahendragarh district, Haryana, India.

History
Deroli Jat is a village in Mahendra Garh Block of Mahendragarh district in Haryana. It is a distant village in rural region of Mahendragarh district of Haryana, it is one of the 89 villages of Mahendra Garh Block of Mahendragarh district.

Geography
It has an average elevation of 237 metres (830 feet). The village in the Eolian plain area and is surrounded by small hills.

EC Value in Micro Mhos/Cm is above 6000.

Demographics
Deroli Jat is a large village located in Mahendragarh of Mahendragarh district, Haryana with total 437 families residing. The village had a population of 2219 according to the 2011 Census of India. 1156 people were males while 1063 were female.

Administration
As per the administration register, the village number of Deroli Jat is 62049.

Amenities
For the health and nutrition of women and their infants till the age of 6 Integrated Child Development Services and Anganwadi serves the purpose. Accredited Social Health Activist also help in monitoring the health of women and infants of the village.

Transport

Road
National Highway 17 is the nearest National highway passing through Nangal Sirohi. Another National highway No. 26 is also the nearest National highway passing through Narnaul. A state highway No. 127 is the nearest state highway passing through Seehma ending at Narnaul- Mahendrgarh Road i.e. NH No. 17.
Village is thus connected by Nangal Sirohi-Deroli Jat road. It is also connectivity by Bus by Seehma-Deroli-Kuksi Road which leads to Dhaula Kuan, Delhi via Ateli & Rewari .

Railway
Ateli railway station in Ateli having Station Code AEL is the nearest Railway Station which is 16.7 km, which is located along the Rewari-Narnaul route.

Employment and education
Gps Deroli Jat School located in Deroli Jat, Khatiwas, is one of the Co-Educational institutions managed by Department of Education. This school serves the purpose of providing Primary education only.

Religion
Baba Nand Ram Das mandir is the oldest temple for worship.

References

Cities and towns in Mahendragarh district
Mahendragarh
Tourism in Haryana